La Pedra is a locality located in the municipality of La Coma i la Pedra, in Province of Lleida province, Catalonia, Spain. As of 2020, it has a population of 48.

Geography 
La Pedra is located 145km northeast of Lleida.

References

Populated places in the Province of Lleida